Carrie Menkel-Meadow is an American lawyer and scholar of dispute resolution. In 2018, she was the recipient of the Outstanding Scholar Award by the American Bar Foundation.

Early life and education
Menkel-Meadow graduated with an A.B. in sociology from Barnard College in 1971 and earned her J.D. from University of Pennsylvania Law School.

Career
Menkel-Meadow was a Fulbright Scholar in 2007. She is a Distinguished Professor of Law at University of California, Irvine School of Law.

Menkel-Meadow is the author of Mediation and Its Applications for Good Decision Making and Dispute Resolution (2016); Negotiation: Processes for Problem Solving (2nd.ed 2014); Mediation: Theory, Policy & Practice (2nd ed. 2013); Dispute Resolution: Beyond the Adversarial Model (2nd ed. 2011); and Dispute Processing & Conflict Resolution (2003).

References

1949 births
Living people
American women lawyers
American legal scholars
Barnard College alumni
University of California, Irvine faculty
University of Pennsylvania Law School alumni
American women legal scholars
21st-century American women